McQuillen is a surname of Irish origin and related to the similar family names McQuilken, McQuillan, McQuiller and McQuilling. Notable people with the surname include:

Bob McQuillen (1923–2014), American musician and composer
Glenn McQuillen (1915–1989), American professional baseball player
Kathleen E. McQuillen (born 1955), American, Pioneer of Open Heart Surgery Detroit Michigan

See also
McQuillan

Anglicised Scottish Gaelic-language surnames